

The Levasseur PL.14 was a torpedo bomber seaplane developed in France in the late 1920s. It was essentially similar to Levasseur's PL.7 carrier-based reconnaissance aircraft with the addition of pontoons. The design dispensed with the small underwing floats that formed part of the safety equipment of Levasseur's carrier-based aircraft of the period, but retained the boat-like fuselage. The wing was built to the 18.00-metre design originally developed for the PL.7 but ultimately rejected in favour of a shorter wing.

Thirty PL.14s were purchased to equip the seaplane base at Berre. When the PL.7s were grounded in 1931, PL.14s were equipped with wheeled undercarriage and put aboard the carrier Béarn in their place. Even after the PL.7s' return to service, four wheeled PL.14s remained aboard Béarn from 1935 to 1937.

Units using this aircraft

 Aéronavale
 Escadrille 7B2

Specifications

See also

Notes

References

 
 
 aviafrance.com

1920s French bomber aircraft
Floatplanes
Levasseur aircraft
Biplanes
Single-engined tractor aircraft
Aircraft first flown in 1929